Helminthoglypta tudiculata, common names the southern California shoulderband or southern shoulderband, is a species of air-breathing land snail, a terrestrial pulmonate gastropod mollusk in the family Helminthoglyptidae.

This snail is endemic to the United States.

Anatomy
This species creates and uses love darts as part of its mating behavior.

References

 Taxonomy at: 
 Image of a mating pair at: 
 Image of a live individual at: 

Molluscs of the United States
Helminthoglypta
Gastropods described in 1838